Violet Emily Wegner, Countess d'Usseaux, Princess Ljubica of Montenegro, (1887–1960), was a British singer who made a career in the music halls from the age of 15 and became known as the "Idol of Berlin".

Life 
She was the daughter of an Extradition Department detective of Scotland Yard, William T. Wegner, and Arabella Eliza née Darby, who lived in the Tulse Hill district of south London.

In 1912, Violet married her first husband, Comte Sergio Francesco Enrico Maria Brunetta d'Usseaux (born 3 March 1885, Torino, Italy), in London. Sergio's parents were Comte Eugenio Brunetta d'Usseaux and the Russian Countess Katarina Zeiffart. Eugenio was Secretary General of the Olympic Committee that administered the 1908 London Olympics. Eugenio died in 1919 in mysterious circumstances. The fate of Serge is also unknown, although it is suggested he may have been trying to research the circumstances of his father's death following the October Revolution.

Violet enjoyed some success as a music hall artiste and was seen in many productions across England and the European continent. Whilst travelling in Italy during 1918, Violet met Prince Peter of Montenegro, the youngest son of the exiled King Nicholas I of Montenegro. Violet was chaperoned by her mother, Arabella, who advised them to delay the marriage until the new Yugoslav government awarded the monies claimed by the prince for the confiscation of his family's property in Montenegro; she feared Violet being a commoner would count against Prince Pierre's case. Violet married Pierre in Paris in April 1924, before any settlement was made. After her marriage Violet converted to Orthodox faith and became HRH Princess Ljubica of Montenegro and thus sister-in-law to Queen Elena of Italy, as well as a host of other European princes and kings via her husband's siblings.

Violet and Pierre continued to live on the continent, particularly at Monte Carlo where they were regular visitors to the Casino. Once married, Violet gave up her performing career. Violet did not forget her former profession and those who 'trod the boards,' however: the only wreath to be sent by a member of any royal family to the funeral of the celebrated Lillie Langtry in Jersey on 23 February 1929 was sent by the Prince and Princess Pierre of Montenegro. Prince Pierre died in 1932 at a sanatorium in Merano, Italy, aged 42.

References

People from Tulse Hill
1887 births
1960 deaths
20th-century British women singers